The Barranquilla Open is a tournament for professional female tennis players played on outdoor hard courts. The event is classified as a $60,000 ITF Women's World Tennis Tour tournament and has been held in Barranquilla, Colombia, since 2022.

Past finals

Singles

Doubles

External links 
 ITF search

ITF Women's World Tennis Tour
Hard court tennis tournaments
Tennis tournaments in Colombia
2022 establishments in Colombia
Recurring sporting events established in 2022